Longmen County, alternately romanized as Lungmoon, is a county of Guangdong, China, administered as part of the prefecture-level city of Huizhou.

Geography
The northernmost county-level division of Huizhou, Longmen County borders Dongyuan County to the east, Boluo County to the south, Zengcheng and Conghua to the west, and Xinfeng County to the north.

Administrative divisions
Longmen County comprises two subdistrict, seven towns, and a township:

Demographics
In addition to Mandarin, there are several local languages spoken within Longmen County: Cantonese, Hakka, Minnan, and ethnic-minority languages such as Yao and She.

Notable people
 Chen Zhihao, professional gamer
Hu Tinglan, a Jinshi from Zengcheng in Ming Dynasty

Transport
The Shaoguan-Huizhou Expressway is currently under construction.

Climate

Notes

References

Citations

Bibliography
 .

County-level divisions of Guangdong
Huizhou